Suraj Mandal  is an Indian footballer who plays as a midfielder. Mandal has played in the I-League with Mohun Bagan and United.

References

Living people
Indian footballers
Mohun Bagan AC players
Southern Samity players
United SC players
Footballers from West Bengal
Association football midfielders
I-League players
Year of birth missing (living people)